Kanhan Junction railway station (station code: KNHN) is a junction railway station in Nagpur SEC railway division of South East Central Railway Zone of Indian Railways. It serves Kanhan (Pipri) is a census town in Nagpur District in the Indian state of Maharashtra.

References

Railway stations in Nagpur district
Nagpur SEC railway division
Railway junction stations in Maharashtra